The Real Thing Tour (also known as The Real Thing: An Evening with Jill Scott) is the fifth concert tour by American recording artist, Jill Scott. Visiting North America and Europe, the tour promoted the singer's third studio album, The Real Thing: Words and Sounds Vol. 3. The trek yielded the singer's first concert special for TV One entitled, Jill Scott: The Real Thing Tour (Live in Philly). The tour featured singers Raheem DeVaughn and Bilal as opening acts.

Background
Stemming from the success of her album, Scott announced the tour through her website in December 2007 with 17 dates. In January, additional dates were released. Opening for Scott on tour was fellow neo soul singer, Raheem DeVaughn. To coincide with the tour, Hidden Beach decided to release the singer's second live album, Jill Scott: Live in Paris+. Filmed and recorded at the historic Élysée Montmartre, the CD/DVD package contains selected tracks from Scott's 2004 European tour. Additionally, it contains four new tracks from her current album, performed during her U.S. promotional tour. During the stint of the tour, Scott received a Grammy Award for Daydreamin'.

The singer Bilal also joined the tour as an opening act, in the midst of his own period of touring in the aftermath of his unreleased but leaked second album Love for Sale. His live band included pianist Robert Glasper, bassist Conley "Tone" Whitfield, and drummer Chris "Daddy" Dave.

The trek originally concluded in March 2008, however, Scott added additional dates in the United States during the summer, along with festival appearances in Europe. Once the tour was complete, Scott returned to Botswana to film the series The No. 1 Ladies' Detective Agency.

Opening acts
 Raheem DeVaughn (North America—Leg 1)
 Bilal (North America—Leg 2)

Set list

{{hidden
| headercss = background: #ccccff; font-size: 100%; width: 75%;
| contentcss = text-align: left; font-size: 100%; width: 75%;
| header = North America/Europe (Set II)
| content =June 18 – August 28
"Rightness"
"Let It Be"
"The Real Thing"
"A Long Walk"
"Epiphany"
"Insomnia"
"Only You"
"Whenever You're Around"
"Slowly Surely"
"The Way"
"How It Make You Feel"
"Do You Remember"
"Come See Me"
"Imagination (Crown Royal Suite)"
"Gimme"
"It's Love"
Encore
"Golden"
"Hate On Me"
"He Loves Me (Lyzel In E Flat)"
"And I Heard...(Do You Understand)"
}}

Tour dates

Festivals and other miscellaneous performances

This concert was a part of the "JVC Jazz Festival"
This concert was a part of the "Hampton Jazz Festival"
This concert was a part of the "Essence Music Festival"
This concert was a part of the "North Sea Jazz Festival"
This concert was a part of the "Montreux Jazz Festival"

This concert was a part of the "Sporting Summer Festival"
This concert was a part of the "Macy's Music Festival"
This concert was a part of the "Classic Soul Series"
This concert was a part of the "Summer Spirit Concert Series"
This concert was a part of the "Martin Luther King, Jr. Concert Series"

Cancellations and rescheduled shows

Box office score data

Broadcasts and recordings
The tour was recorded for a concert special on the U.S. based TV One. The special, Jill Scott: The Real Thing Tour (Live in Philly), was filmed in Scott's hometown of Philadelphia at the Liacouras Center. For a crowd of over seven thousand, Scott performed tracks from her newest album, along with her greatest hits. The special aired June 29, 2008.

Personnel
Crew
Lighting Designer: Martin Thomas
Lighting Crew Chief: Wayne Bukovinsky
Lighting Technician: Dylan Haines
Musical Director: Noel Terrell

References

Jill Scott (singer) concert tours
2008 concert tours